The year 587 BC was a year of the pre-Julian Roman calendar. In the Roman Empire, it was known as year 167 Ab urbe condita . The denomination 587 BC for this year has been used since the early medieval period, when the Anno Domini calendar era became the prevalent method in Europe for naming years.

Events
 Jerusalem is conquered by the Babylonians, ending the Kingdom of Judah. The temple of Jerusalem is destroyed and some of the inhabitants are exiled. An alternate date of 586 BC has also been proposed for this event.

Births

Deaths

References